Weather warfare is the use of weather modification techniques such as cloud seeding for military purposes.

Background

Use 
Prior to the Environmental Modification Convention signed in Geneva in 1977, the United States used weather warfare in the Vietnam War. Operation Popeye saw the use of cloud seeding over the Ho Chi Minh trail. It was hoped that the increased rainfall would reduce the rate of infiltration down the trail.

A research paper produced for the United States Air Force written in 1996 speculates about the future use of nanotechnology to produce "artificial weather", clouds of microscopic computer particles all communicating with each other to form an "intelligent fog" that could be used for various purposes. "Artificial weather technologies do not currently exist. But as they are developed, the importance of their potential applications rises rapidly."

The Convention on the Prohibition of Military or Any Other Hostile Use of Environmental Modification Techniques (Geneva: May 18, 1977, Entered into force: October 5, 1978) prohibits "widespread, long-lasting or severe effects as the means of destruction, damage or injury". In 1972 an ENMOD  convention on weather warfare presented that this permits "local, non-permanent changes". The "Consultative Committee of Experts" established in Article VIII of the Convention stated in their "Understanding relating to Article II" that any use of environmental modification where this is done "as a means of destruction, damage or injury to another State Party, would be prohibited.". It also suggests all signatories are expected to abstain from using weather modification to cause harm at any scale, stating "military or any other hostile use of environmental modification techniques, would result, or could reasonably be expected to result, in widespread, long-lasting or severe destruction, damage or injury." However, the treaty does not directly condemn military use of weather modification when it does not directly cause harm, such as the United States' use of weather modification in the siege of Khe Sanh, discussed above. The limitations of the treaty, and its application only to signatory states, allow weather warfare to continue to play a role in warfare throughout the twenty-first century. The United States prohibits weather modification without permission of the United States Secretary of Commerce.

See also 
 Weather Modification Operations and Research Board

References

External links
 Non Lethal Warfare Proposal:Weather Modification, The Sunshine Projectpurposes.

Weather modification
Warfare by type
Meteorological hypotheses